Elaeocarpus johnsonii, commonly known as Kuranda quandong or Johnson's quandong, is species of flowering plant in the family Elaeocarpaceae and is endemic to north-east Queensland. It is a small to medium-sized tree, often with several main stems, elliptic to egg-shaped leaves with the narrower end towards the base, racemes of up to seven flowers, the petals with fringed lobes, and dark blue fruit.

Description
Young branchlets are densely covered with woolly-brownish or velvety hairs. There are between thirty and thirty-five stamens.

Taxonomy
Elaeocarpus johnsonii was first formally described in 1893 by Ferdinand von Mueller in the Journal of Botany, British and Foreign.

The authorship of E. johnson is attributed to "F.Muell. ex C.T.White" by Plants of the World Online because White noted that he had been unable to find the place of publication.

Distribution and habitat

Ecology
Cassowaries eat fallen fruit of E. johnsonii and native rats eats the seeds.

Conservation status
This quandong is listed as of "least concern" under the Queensland Government Nature Conservation Act 1992.

References

johnsonii
Oxalidales of Australia
Flora of Queensland
Plants described in 1893
Taxa named by Ferdinand von Mueller